Cornerstone is the second studio album by American country music artist Holly Dunn, released in 1987.  Although it yielded no #1 hits, as would some of her later albums, Cornerstone would attain the highest Billboard Top Country Albums rating in her career for Holly Dunn at #22, based on three hits which made it into the Country Top Ten singles list: the #2 "Love Someone Like Me," the #4 "Only When I Love," and the #7 "Strangers Again."

Track listing

Chart performance

References

Holly Dunn albums
1987 albums
MTM Records albums
Albums produced by Tommy West (producer)